Moonamchery Michal (born 18 May 1983) is an Indian-born cricketer who plays for the Oman national cricket team. He made his List A debut for Oman against Scotland on 19 February 2019, following the 2018–19 Oman Quadrangular Series. Prior to his List A debut, he was named in Oman's squad for the 2018 ACC Emerging Teams Asia Cup tournament. In March 2019, he was named in Oman's team for the 2019 ICC World Cricket League Division Two tournament in Namibia.

References

External links
 

1983 births
Living people
Cricketers from Thrissur
Omani cricketers
Indian emigrants to Oman
Indian expatriates in Oman